Korostýšiv is a city in Zhytomyr Raion, Zhytomyr Oblast, Ukraine. Prior to 2020, it served as the administrative center of the former Korostyshiv Raion. Population:

History 
The city was founded around the VI-VII centuries. According to legend, the town was called Khminychi and was the center of one of the Drevlians tribes, the Minskians.

The first written mention as a village of Zhitomirsky Uyezd, Kyiv Voivodeship of the Grand Duchy of Lithuania dates back to March 26, 1499. For sixty-five years it belonged to the Chornobyl Kmyts, a well-known and influential family of Right-bank Ukraine. Since 1565, after it was sold by Filon Kmita, the town became the property of the Olizar family, who later received the title of counts.

In July 1768, Ivan Bondarenko's Cossacks visited the town.

In 1779, Magdeburg rights and a coat of arms were granted with the image of the family emblem of the Olizar Counts: a golden church flag with a cross on a red background (noble coat of arms "Radvan"). After the second partition of Poland in 1793, Korostyshiv became part of the Russian Empire. Since 1795, the town has been part of the Radomyslsky Uyezd of the Volhynian Governorate, and since 1797 it has been transferred to the Kyiv Governorate, which was part of it for more than 120 years. The Olizar family remained the owners of Korostyshev until 1873. Most of the lands of the manor were forests.

According to the 1897 census, 7,863 residents lived in the city.

On Oct 9, 1900 Henry de La Vaulx (1870–1930 and a companion set a distance record in a balloon traveling 1200 miles from Vincennes to Korostyshiv. in 35.75 hours

In 1938, the status of a city was granted.

In January 1989, the population was 28 046 people.

Gallery

International relations

Twin towns — Sister cities
 Kohtla-Järve, Estonia

References

Cities in Zhytomyr Oblast
Zhytomyr Raion
Radomyslsky Uyezd
Kiev Voivodeship
Cities of district significance in Ukraine